Strictly Come Dancing returned for its sixth series on 20 September 2008 on BBC One. Bruce Forsyth and Tess Daly returned as co-presenters of the main show on BBC One, whilst Claudia Winkleman returned to present spin-off show Strictly Come Dancing: It Takes Two on BBC Two. Craig Revel Horwood, Arlene Phillips, Len Goodman and Bruno Tonioli returned as judges.

The show featured 16 celebrities (two more than the previous series) who were paired with 16 professional dancers. The new professionals were Brian Fortuna and Hayley Holt, who had previously appeared in the American and New Zealand versions of the show respectively, and Russian dancer Kristina Rihanoff, who had taken part in the Dancing with the Stars tour. Nicole Cutler was the only professional from the previous series not to return.

On 20 December 2008, actor Tom Chambers and his professional partner, Camilla Dallerup were crowned series champions.

This was the last series to feature Phillips on the judging panel, as she was controversially replaced by series 5 winner Alesha Dixon for the seventh series until 2011.

Format

The couples dance each week in a live show. The judges score each performance out of ten (with four judges giving a maximum score of forty). The couples are then ranked according to the judges' scores and given points according to their rank, with the lowest scored couple receiving one point, and the highest scored couple receiving the most points (the maximum number of points available depends on the number of couples remaining in the competition). The public are also invited to vote for their favourite couples, and the couples are ranked again according to the number of votes they receive, again receiving points- the couple with the fewest votes receiving one point, and the couple with the most votes receiving the most points.

The points for judges' score and public vote are then added together, and the two couples with the fewest points are placed in the bottom two (if two couples have equal points, the points from the public vote are given precedence). As with the previous series, the bottom two couples will have to perform a dance-off on the results show. Based on that performance alone, each judge then votes on which couple should stay and which couple should leave, with Goodman (as head judge) having the last and casting vote.

However, the situation was different on 13 December 2008, the semi-final, when it was announced in the live results show that all three remaining couples would be going through to the final, regardless of the judges' scores and the public vote. This was due to a tie at the top of the leaderboard, which made it mathematically impossible for Tom Chambers and Camilla Dallerup to avoid the dance-off. Despite this, viewers were encouraged to vote, although the problem was noticed by the start of the results show, which was shortened by 10 minutes. All phone votes cast were carried on to the following Saturday, the final. Since then, the system has been modified, so instead of having a traditional tie structure for points, such as 3–3–1 (as was the case here), the system 3–3–2 is now used. This therefore ensures that each couple can mathematically avoid the bottom two.

Couples
This year there were 16 couples: 8 male celebrities and 8 female celebrities.

Scoring chart

Average chart
This table only counts for dances scored on a traditional 40-points scale

Highest and lowest scoring performances 
The best and worst performances in each dance according to the judges' scores are as follows:

Weekly scores and songs
Unless indicated otherwise, individual judges scores in the charts below (given in parentheses) are listed in this order from left to right: Craig Revel Horwood, Arlene Phillips, Len Goodman, Bruno Tonioli.

Week 1 
Musical guest: Bette Midler—"Wind Beneath My Wings"
Running order

Judges' votes to save
Horwood: Phil & Flavia
Phillips: Phil & Flavia
Tonioli: Don & Lilia
Goodman: Don & Lilia

Week 2 
Musical guest: Sugababes—"Girls"
Running order

Judges' votes to save
Horwood: Jodie & Ian
Phillips: Jodie & Ian
Toniolil: Jodie & Ian
Goodman: Did not vote, but would have voted to save Jodie & Ian.

Week 3 
Musical guest: Andrea Bocelli—"Canto della Terra"
Running order

Judges' votes to save
Horwood: Mark & Hayley
Phillips: Mark & Hayley
Tonioli: Mark & Hayley
Goodman: Did not vote, but would have voted to save Mark & Hayley.

Week 4 
Musical guest: Simply Red—"Something Got Me Started"
Running order

Judges' votes to save
Horwood: Heather & Brian
Phillips: Heather & Brian
Tonioli: Heather & Brian
Goodman: Did not vote, but would have voted to save Jessie & Darren.

Week 5
Musical guests: Alesha Dixon—"The Boy Does Nothing"; Katherine Jenkins and Darcey Bussell—"Viva Tonight"
Running order

Judges' votes to save
Horwood: Heather & Brian
Phillips: Heather & Brian
Tonioli: Heather & Brian
Goodman: Did not vote, but would have voted to save Don & Lilia.

Week 6
Musical guests: Enrique Iglesias—"Hero"
Running order

Judges' votes to save
Horwood: Andrew & Ola
Phillips: Andrew & Ola
Tonioli: Andrew & Ola
Goodman: Did not vote, but would have voted to save Andrew & Ola.

Week 7
Musical guest: Stereophonics—"Handbags and Gladrags"
Running order

Judges' votes to save
Horwood: Heather & Brian
Phillips: Heather & Brian
Tonioli: Heather & Brian
Goodman: Did not vote, but would have voted to save Heather & Brian.

Week 8
Musical guest: Beyonce—"If I Were a Boy"
Running order

Judges' votes to save
Horwood: Rachel & Vincent
Phillips: Rachel & Vincent
Tonioli: Rachel & Vincent
Goodman: Did not vote, but would have voted to save Rachel & Vincent.

Week 9
Running order

Judges' votes to save
Horwood: Lisa & Brendan
Phillips: Lisa & Brendan
Tonioli: Cherie & James
Goodman: Lisa & Brendan

Week 10
Running order

*John & Kristina withdrew from the show earlier in the week, and therefore only appeared on the show to say farewell.
Judges' votes to save
Horwood: Lisa & Brendan
Phillips: Lisa & Brendan
Tonioli: Lisa & Brendan
Goodman: Did not vote, but would have voted to save Lisa & Brendan.

Week 11
Musical guest: Estelle—"American Boy"
Running order

Judges' votes to save
Horwood: Rachel & Vincent
Phillips: Rachel & Vincent
Tonioli: Rachel & Vincent
Goodman: Did not vote, but would have voted to save Rachel & Vincent.

Week 12: Quarter-final
Musical guest: Barry Manilow—"Copacabana"
Running order

Judges' votes to save
Horwood: Lisa & Brendan
Phillips: Lisa & Brendan
Tonioli: Lisa & Brendan
Goodman: Did not vote, but would have voted to save Lisa & Brendan.

Week 13: Semi-final
Musical guest: Cast of Chicago—"All That Jazz"
Running order

Week 14: The Final
Musical guest: Duffy—"Mercy"
Running order

Dance chart

 Highest scoring dance
 Lowest scoring dance

Week 1 – Cha-Cha-Cha or Waltz (male celebrities only), Group Cha-Cha-Cha (female celebrities only)
Week 2 – Salsa or Foxtrot (female celebrities only), Group Merengue (male celebrities only)
Week 3 – Jive or Tango (male celebrities only), Group Swing Dance (female celebrities only)
Week 4 – Rumba or Quickstep (female celebrities only), Group Rueda (male celebrities only)
Week 5 – Samba or American Smooth
Week 6 – Paso Doble or Viennese Waltz
Weeks 7–10 – One unlearned dance
Weeks 11 & 12 – Two unlearned dances
Week 13 – Argentine Tango and one re-choreographed routine in a previously performed style.
Week 14: Final – favourite Ballroom, favourite Latin, Group Viennese Waltz, and Freestyle.

Ratings 
Weekly ratings for each show on BBC One. All numbers are in millions and provided by BARB. Series average excludes the launch show.

References

External links

Strictly Come Dancing news, gossip, reviews at Unreality TV

Season 06
2008 British television seasons